Nototrichium humile is a rare species of flowering plant in the family Amaranthaceae known by the common names kaala rockwort and kulu'i. It is endemic to Hawaii, where it is now limited to the island of Oahu, having been extirpated from Maui. It is a federally listed endangered species of the United States.

The main threat to the species is fire. Most populations occur on the Makua Military Reservation in the Waianae Range of Oahu, in territory at high risk for fire. Other threats include damage to the habitat by feral goats, and competition with introduced species of plants, such as pamakani haole (Ageratina adenophora), spreading mist flower (Ageratina riparia), dog tail (Buddleja asiatica), wait-a-bit (Caesalpinia decapetala), ti (Cordyline fruticosa), silk oak (Grevillea robusta), koa haole (Leucaena leucocephala), pride of India (Melia azedarach), and molasses grass (Melinis minutiflora).

This shrub grows upright or trailing and produces slender spikes of flowers.

References

External links
USDA Plants Profile

Amaranthaceae
Endemic flora of Hawaii